Bijelo Dugme is the seventh studio album by former Yugoslav and Bosnian rock band Bijelo Dugme. Due to Bijelo Dugme's usage of Uroš Predić's famous painting Kosovo Maiden for the album cover, the album is unofficially known as Kosovka djevojka (trans. Kosovo Maiden).

Bijelo Dugme is the band's only album recorded with vocalist Mladen Vojičić "Tifa", who came to the band as the replacement for Željko Bebek. The album is also notable for featuring the band's former member Laza Ristovski, who, after the album was released, became an official member of the band once again. The album was praised for the usage of computers and digital synthesizers, with the band leader Goran Bregović claiming that the use of such instruments increased their musical sphere; this culminated in the success of the album. Ristovski was known for reusing his equipment on Pljuni i zapjevaj moja Jugoslavijo.

Bijelo Dugme was listed in 1998 as the 28th on the list of 100 greatest Yugoslav rock and pop albums in the book YU 100: najbolji albumi jugoslovenske rok i pop muzike (YU 100: The Best Albums of Yugoslav Pop and Rock Music).

Background and recording

Following protracted disagreements over revenue sharing, Bijelo Dugme vocalist Željko Bebek left the band in April 1984, deciding to focus on his solo career. The band's new singer became a former Top and Teška Industrija member Mladen Vojičić Tifa. The band spent the summer of 1984 in Rovinj, where they held small performances in Monvi tourist centre, preparing for the upcoming studio album recording sessions.

The album was recorded in Sarajevo, Skopje, Zagreb, and Belgrade. The working title of the album, Još uvijek nas ima (We're Still Here), was discarded after it was decided that Uroš Predić's painting would appear on the cover. Bijelo Dugme featured Radio Television of Skopje Folk Instruments Orchestra, folk group Ladarice on backing vocals, Pece Atanasovski on gaida and Sonja Beran-Leskovšek on harp. The song "Pediculis pubis" (misspelling of "Pediculosis pubis") featured Bora Đorđević, the leader of Bijelo Dugme's main competitors at the time, Riblja Čorba, on vocals. Đorđević co-wrote the song with Bijelo Dugme leader Goran Bregović, and sung it with Bregović and Vojičić. (Bregović would, in return, make a guest appearance on Riblja Čorba 1985 album Istina, singing with Đorđević in the song "Disko mišić".) Đorđević had an idea of political song, with lyrics mentioning names and nicknames of Yugoslav politicians, but Bregović persuaded him that the song should feature joking lyrics about pubic lice. The final mix of the album was done by German producer Theo Werdin, who initially came to Sarajevo to produce Divlje Jagode's album Vatra, but whom Diskoton, after his arrival, hired to work on Bijelo Dugme.

The album featured a version of Yugoslav national anthem, "Hej, Slaveni", as the opening track. The song "Lipe cvatu, sve je isto k'o i lani" ("Linden Trees Are in Bloom, Everything's Just Like It Used to Be") is musically based on the song "Šta ću nano dragi mi je ljut" ("What Can I Do, Mom, My Darling Is Angry"), written by Bregović and originally recorded by Bisera Veletanlić.

Track listing

Personnel
Goran Bregović - guitar, producer (track 1)
Mladen Vojičić - vocals
Zoran Redžić - bass guitar
Ipe Ivandić - drums
Vlado Pravdić - keyboard

Additional personnel
Ladarice - backing vocals
Bora Đorđević - vocals (track 7)
Laza Ristovski - keyboards, computer programming PPG WAVE 2.3 / PPG WAVETERM B computer 
Pece Atanasovski - gaida (track 6)
Sonja Beran-Leskovšek - harp (track 10)
Radio Television of Skopje Folk Instruments Orchestra (track 6)
Mufid Kosović - engineer
Mladen Škalec - recorded by Ladarice
Milka Gerasimova - recorded by Radio Television of Skopje Folk Instruments Orchestra
Ratko Ostojić - recorded by computer (track 3)
Theo Werdin - mixing

Reception and events following the release
The album was well received by the audience. "Lipe cvatu, sve je isto k'o i lani" was the album's biggest hit. Other hits included "Padaju zvijezde", "Lažeš", "Da te bogdo ne volim" and "Jer kad ostariš". Many critics, however, disliked the album.

The album sale and the tour were very successful. The album sold more than 420,000 copies.

Vojičić, under the pressure of professional obligations, sudden fame, and a media scandal caused by revelation of his LSD usage, decided to leave the band. He performed with Bijelo Dugme for the last time at a concert in Moscow.

Influence and legacy

Bijelo Dugme'''s folk-oriented pop rock sound, alongside the idea of Yugoslavism, present on the album via cover of "Hej, Sloveni", influenced a great number of pop rock bands from Sarajevo, like Merlin, Plavi Orkestar, Crvena Jabuka, Valentino and Hari Mata Hari, often labeled as New Partisans.

The album polled in 1998 as the 28th on the list of 100 greatest Yugoslav rock and pop albums in the book YU 100: najbolji albumi jugoslovenske rok i pop muzike (YU 100: The Best Albums of Yugoslav Pop and Rock Music).

In 2000, "Lipe cvatu" and "Za Esmu" polled at 10th and 78th spot respectively on the Rock Express Top 100 Yugoslav Rock Songs of All Times list.

In 2007, Serbian critic Dimitrije Vojnov named Bijelo Dugme one of ten most important records in the history of Yugoslav rock, despite having a negative opinion of the album.

In 2011, Radio 202 listeners voted "Meni se ne spava" ("I Don't Feel like Sleeping") one of the 60 greatest songs released by PGP-RTB/PGP-RTS during the 60 years of the label's existence.

In 2015 Bijelo Dugme album cover was ranked the 1st on the list of 100 Greatest Album Covers of Yugoslav Rock published by web magazine Balkanrock.

Covers
Serbian and Yugoslav folk singer Zorica Brunclik recorded a cover of "Lipe cvatu, sve je isto k'o i lani" on her 1993 album Branili su našu ljubav (They Were against Our Love).
Bosnian turbo folk singer Igor Vukojević recorded a cover of "Lažeš" on his 2003 album Ringišpil (Carousel).
Serbian ensemble Ekrem Sajdić Trumpet Orchestra recorded an instrumental cover of "Lipe cvatu, sve je isto k'o i lani" on 2004 various artists album Kad jeknu dragačevske trube 2 (When the Trumpets of Dragačevo Start Playing 2).
Serbian folk singer Saša Matić recorded a cover of "Lipe cvatu" on his 2010 cover album Nezaboravne... (Unforgettable Ones...'').

References

External links
Bijelo Dugme at Discogs

1984 albums
Bijelo Dugme albums
Diskoton albums